Millard Davis (August 3, 1883 – September 15, 1957) was an American lawyer, farmer, and politician from New York.

Life 
Davis was born on August 3, 1883 in Boiceville, New York, the son of Millard H. Davis and Ella Weidner.

Davis attended New York Law School. He was admitted to the bar in 1904 and practiced law in New York City with the firm Cravath, Swaine and Moore. In 1917, he left his law practice and moved to Arrowhead Farm in Kerkonkson, which became one of the most successful farms in the area. He was a director of the Dairymen's League and served as county president of the fifth district from 1919 to 1953. He was a director of the Accord Farmers Cooperative Association, serving as its president from 1930 to 1945. He was justice of the peace for his town. He served as president of the Ulster County Farm and 4-H Club Association for 10 years. He was president of the New York State Agricultural Society and, through that office, a trustee of Cornell University from 1938 to 1939. He was also a director of the Olive Cooperative Fire Insurance Cooperation.

In 1924, Davis was elected to the New York State Assembly as a Republican, representing Ulster County. He served in the Assembly in 1925, 1926, 1927, 1928, 1929, 1930, 1931, and 1932.

Davis attended the Rochester Reformed Church of Accord. He was an active member of the Patroon Grange in Accord. In 1922, he married Roswitha Kudlich. Their children were Ann Meredith and Philip.

Davis died in Veterans Memorial Hospital in Ellenville on September 15, 1957. He was buried in Pine Bush Cemetery.

References

External links 

 The Political Graveyard
 Millard Davis at Find a Grave

1883 births
1957 deaths
People from Ulster County, New York
New York Law School alumni
20th-century American lawyers
Lawyers from New York City
Farmers from New York (state)
American justices of the peace
20th-century American politicians
Republican Party members of the New York State Assembly
Reformed Church in America members
Burials in Ulster County, New York